The 1979 Air Canada Cup was Canada's inaugural national midget 'AAA' hockey championship. It took place April 16 – 22, 1979 at the Winnipeg Arena in Winnipeg, Manitoba. The Canadian Amateur Hockey Association established the Air Canada Cup for the 1978–79 season as the new official midget championship, replacing the invitational Wrigley National Midget Tournament.

The Couillard de Ste-Foy (Quebec) captured the first national championship, defeating St. Michael's College Buzzers (Ontario) in the gold medal game. The Notre Dame Hounds (Saskatchewan) took the bronze medal.

Future National Hockey League players competing at the inaugural Air Canada Cup were Garry Galley, Paul Gillis, Mike Moller, Randy Moller, Tony Tanti, James Patrick, and future Hall of Fame defenceman Al MacInnis.

Teams

Round robin

DC8 Flight

Standings

Scores

St. Michael's College 6 - Red Deer 0
Notre Dame 11 - Andrews 2
North Shore 4 - St. James 3
North Shore 8 - Red Deer 8
St. Michael's College 5 - Notre Dame 3
St. James 2 - Andrews 2
Notre Dame 3 - North Shore 2
St. Michael's College 5 - Andrews 2
St. James 5 - Red Deer 3
North Shore 4 - St. Michael's College 3
Red Deer 8 - Andrews 2
Notre Dame 4 - St. James 3
North Shore 9 - Andrews 2
Notre Dame 4 - Red Deer 2
St. Michael's College 5 - St. James 2

DC9 Flight

Standings

Scores

Ottawa West 5 - Antigonish 4
Ste-Foy 14 - Corner Brook 1
Eastern 4 - Moncton 3
Ottawa West 5 - Corner Brook 1
Ste-Foy 9 - Eastern 1
Antigonish 5 - Moncton 4
Ste-Foy 8 - Moncton 1
Ottawa West 5 - Eastern 2
Corner Brook 4 - Antigonish 2
Ottawa West 3 - Moncton 3
Ste-Foy 7 - Antigonish 2
Eastern 5 - Corner Brook 4
Antigonish 7 - Eastern 3
Moncton 4 - Corner Brook 1
Ste-Foy 3 - Ottawa West 1

Playoffs

Bronze medal game
Notre Dame 7 - Ottawa West 2

Gold medal game
Ste-Foy 9 - St. Michael's College 7

Individual awards
Most Valuable Player: Pierre Rioux (Ste-Foy)
Top Scorer: Claude Drouin (Ste-Foy)
Most Sportsmanlike Player: Paul Houck (North Shore)

See also
Telus Cup

References

External links
Telus Cup Website
Hockey Canada-Telus Cup Guide and Record Book

Telus Cup
Air Canada Cup
Ice hockey competitions in Winnipeg
April 1979 sports events in Canada